Raymond Havemeyer (June 23, 1884 – February 21, 1925) was an American golfer. He competed in the men's individual event at the 1904 Summer Olympics.

References

1884 births
1925 deaths
Amateur golfers
American male golfers
Olympic golfers of the United States
Golfers at the 1904 Summer Olympics
People from Orange, New Jersey
Sportspeople from Essex County, New Jersey